Stanley Henry Arnzen (August 8, 1914 – April 23, 1977) was an American professional basketball player. He played for the Cincinnati Comellos in the National Basketball League during the 1937–38 season and averaged 4.6 points per game. He played baseball and basketball at Morehead State University for two years.

In 1937, Arnzen signed to play minor league baseball for the Cincinnati Reds organization. He competed for the Welch Miners (1937), Columbia Reds (1938–1939), and the Charleston Senators (1940). He won the Spalding Trophy his first season, given annually to "Outstanding Minor League Player" of that season. A broken leg ended his baseball career before he made it to the MLB.

Arnzen became a high school teacher as well as a baseball and basketball coach at Newport High School in Kentucky. He did not have a losing season in 22 years as basketball coach. 

He was the father of NBA player Bob Arnzen.

References

External links
Newport High School Hall of Fame profile

1914 births
1977 deaths
American baseball players
American men's basketball players
Baseball players from Kentucky
Basketball players from Kentucky
Charleston Senators players
Cincinnati Comellos players
Columbia Reds players
Forwards (basketball)
High school baseball coaches in the United States
High school basketball coaches in Kentucky
Morehead State Eagles baseball players
Morehead State Eagles men's basketball players
People from Newport, Kentucky
Welch Miners players